The 1960 United States Senate election in Tennessee took place on November 8, 1960, concurrently with the U.S. presidential election, as well as elections to the United States Senate in other states as well as elections to the United States House of Representatives and various state and local elections. Democrat Estes Kefauver won re-election, he defeated Republican A. Bradley Frazier.

Democratic primary

Candidates
Estes Kefauver, incumbent Senator
Andrew Taylor
Jake Armstrong

Results

Republican primary

Candidates
A. Bradley Frazier
Hansel Proffitt

Results

Results

See also
1960 United States Senate elections

References

1960
Tennessee
United States Senate